Vena Kava born in the Carpathian region of Eastern Europe is an American artist known mostly for her fantasy art photography and mixed media, singing, and modeling work. Kava originally studied experimental filmmaking at the prestigious San Francisco Art Institute. Kava currently lives in Montreal, Canada.

Early years
Vena Kava was born in Zakopane, Poland where she spent most of her early childhood. When she was 7 years old her family moved to the United States where they have been ever since.

Filmmaking
Kava became interested in the visual arts at college and started painting, taking classes at the Rhode Island School of Design. Becoming frustrated with what she saw as painting's limitation, she abandoned it and moved to Boston to attend Emerson College with a masters specialty in film production. Later in the year, being disappointed with the program, Kava moved to San Francisco and took up experimental and Avant-garde Filmmaking. She decided that the San Francisco Art Institute, a School known for its Laissez-faire attitude towards art, was the only school in America that can offer her the flexibility that she needed in order to fulfill her desire for true experimentation. "[T]here was so much potential I felt in San Francisco, the East Coast Art scene during this time was not really working for me.”

She spent the rest of her college career focused on Filmmaking being heavily influenced by filmmaker Kenneth Anger with films such as Lucifer Rising, Invocation of My Demon Brother, Scorpio Rising and also filmmaker George Kuchar who taught at SFAI. She also started taking classes in New Genre, which was a major available at the school. This short exploration opened up doors and led Vena Kava into the world of performance art.

Awards
In 2005, Kava was the recipient of one of the prestigious STAND grants from The Film Arts Foundation for independent cinema.  She made a short experimental film “She Blow Smoke,” which was highly influenced by Keneth Anger and highlighted some of her early frustrations and personal conflicts.

Music
Kava's first band was WhipKraft which was San Francisco based, in which she led, performed, and sang.  In the band released a Goth/Metal/ Experimental album titled “Welcome to the Chapel Perilous.” While she lived in Boston, she renamed WhipKraft as Killing Moon, a Death Metal band. Kava incorporating the death growl into her vocal style, which was also proved to be a big hit among her fans.

In 2012 Vena Kave moved to Montreal, Canada where she is currently the lead singer of Aversion, a black metal band.

Photography
Having a love for all art, Kava experimented with many genres if art, but only a few of them stuck. Photography was one of them, when Kava discovered the beauty of the still image. “[I] have been feeling like everything is moving so fast lately, year after year, even film is too fast for me 24 frames per second is a lot of frames for the eye to consume.  Photography was perfect, I can meditate on one frame for days and even months.” Kava works typically by photographing herself in a range of costumes, heavily influenced by Photographer Cindy Sherman.

References

Mercer, Mick (2009). "Music to Die For." London. Chery Red Books. 
Sharpe-Young, G  (2005a). New Wave of American Heavy Metal. New Plymouth. Zonda Books Limited; 1st edition. 
Sharpe-Young, G  (2007b). Thrash Metal. New Plymouth. Zonda Books Limited. 
http://www.venakava.net   Official Vena Kava web site
http://148.ca/themic/1001/04.html Interview With Vena Kava for The Mic Online
https://web.archive.org/web/20081019103450/http://www.industrializedmetal.com/2007_whipkraft.htm   Interview with Vena Kava
http://www.fixemagazine.com/venakava.html  Interview With Vena Kava
http://www.whipkraft.com   Vena Kava's band WhipKraft
http://queensofmetal.ru/index.php?option=com_content&task=blogsection&id=109&Itemid=132  Queens of Metal
http://www.eppreu-autogramme.de/index2.html Vena Kava Autograph site
http://www.deadlycreations.org/venakava.cfm Deadly Creations Modeling
http://timtimjohn.googlepages.com   home/Vena Kava history
http://www.graveconcernsezine.com   Written Contributions by Vena Kava
https://www.myspace.com/whipkraft   Myspace WhipKraft info page
https://www.myspace.com/vena_kava  Unofficial Vena Kava Fan Page
http://www.carnifexpress.net/metalqueens/metalqueenspre.htm "Metal Queens, Death Metal" Volume 1, Number 1
http://www.venakava.com   Vena Kava web site

Living people
American speculative fiction artists
Polish speculative fiction artists
American experimental filmmakers
American heavy metal musicians
American photographers
Death metal musicians
Fantasy artists
American women heavy metal singers
Feminist artists
Gothic rock musicians
1986 births
People from Zakopane
21st-century American singers
21st-century American women singers
Women experimental filmmakers
21st-century American women photographers
21st-century American photographers
Feminist musicians